Alfred Cleveland Blumenthal (c. 1891 – July 29, 1957) was an American real estate developer, theatrical promoter and husband of actress Peggy Fears. A C Blumenthal was also a speakeasy owner and friend of New York Mayor Jimmy Walker.

Biography
Blumenthal was born on about 1891, in San Rafael, California, to a woman named Herzog. On June 19, 1927, he married the actress Peggy Fears and they divorced in 1945.  He died on July 29, 1957.
He is mentioned in David Niven's The Moon's a Balloon as hosting a party that included Fears, Mary Duncan ,and architect Phil Henry Ammidown.

References

1890s births
1957 deaths
People from San Rafael, California
American real estate businesspeople